Ashraful Haque (died 17 February 2015) was an Indian actor who mainly appeared in Hindi films and was popularly known for his work in Talaash (2012), Delhi Belly (2011) and Manjhi - The Mountain Man (2015). He also appeared in Black Friday, Company, Deewar, Fukrey, Jungle, and Raavan . He was a graduate of the National School of Drama.

Early life and career
Haque hails from Goalpara in Assam. He graduated from National School of Drama in 1997 with specialisation in Acting. He started his career with critically acclaimed film, Behrupiya and had acted in over 30 films apart from his television serials and ad films. He had also performed in more than 30 plays.  He has a his wife and a son.

Illness and death
He had a rare disorder called myelodysplastic syndrome and was undergoing treatment for sometime. He died on 17 February 2015 at the age of 46.

Filmography
Sab Golmaal Hai
Dil Kya Kare
Mela
Shool
Jungle
Love Ke Liye Kuch Bhi Karega
Lal Salaam
Kranti
Company
Calcutta Mail
Yuva
Deewaar: Let's Bring Our Heroes Home
Black Friday
The White Land
Risk
Khanna and Iyer
The Stoneman Murders
Raavan
Aakrosh
Knock Out
Mumbai Cutting
Red Alert: The War Within
Delhi Belly
Mumbai Mast Kallander
Satrangee Parachute
Chittagong
Paan Singh Tomar
Talaash: The Answer Lies Within
Fukrey
The Lost Behrupiya
Manjhi - The Mountain Man
Game Paisa Ladki

References

External links
 

1960s births
2015 deaths
Indian male television actors
Male actors in Hindi cinema
Male actors from Assam
National School of Drama alumni
People from Goalpara district
20th-century Indian male actors
21st-century Indian male actors